Moradabad Lok Sabha constituency is one of the 80 Lok Sabha (parliamentary) constituencies in western Uttar Pradesh state in northern India.
Formed before the 1952 elections, according to Election Commission of India 2009 data the total electorates in the Moradabad Parliamentary constituency (constituency number 6) were 1,388,525 of which 634,547 are females and 753,978 are males. The administrative headquarters of Moradabad district is situated in the city of Moradabad. It is located in the northern part of the state at a distance of 167 km from the national capital, New Delhi. Hindi is the official language of Moradabad, though Urdu, Punjabi and English are widely spoken. National Highway NH 9 passes through Moradabad.

Assembly segments
At present, after the implementation of the Presidential notification on delimitation on 19 February 2008, Moradabad Lok Sabha constituency comprises five Vidhan Sabha (legislative assembly) segments. Kanth and Thakurdwara assembly segments before 2008 were in erstwhile Amroha and Rampur Lok Sabha constituencies respectively. These are:

List of Members of Parliament

Election results

2019 result

2014 election

General Election, 2009

r

See also
 Moradabad district
 List of Constituencies of the Lok Sabha
 Moradabad (Mayoral Constituency)

Notes

External links
Moradabad lok sabha  constituency election 2019 result details

Lok Sabha constituencies in Uttar Pradesh
Moradabad district